Transmembrane protein 9 is a protein that in humans is encoded by the TMEM9 gene.

References

Further reading